Newell-Fonda Community School District is a rural public school district headquartered in Newell, Iowa.

Located in sections of Buena Vista, Pocahontas, Calhoun, and Sac counties, it serves Newell, Fonda, and Varina. All of the Education and Sports organizations are located in Newell except for the baseball and softball fields, which are located in Fonda. 

, it has about 500 students. It operates Newell-Fonda High School, Newell-Fonda Middle School and Newell-Fonda Elementary School. The district teaches grades Pk-12. The superintendent is Jeff Dicks.

History

It was created on July 1, 1993, as a consolidation of the Fonda Community School District and the Newell-Providence Community School District. In 2014, a new section of the school was added. It included a playground, gym, classrooms, and a library.

See also
List of school districts in Iowa

References

External links
 Newell-Fonda Community School District
 District map - Iowa Secretary of State, 2010.
School districts in Iowa
Education in Buena Vista County, Iowa
Education in Calhoun County, Iowa
Education in Pocahontas County, Iowa
Education in Sac County, Iowa
School districts established in 1993
1993 establishments in Iowa